The white-fin smooth-hound (Mustelus widodoi) is a species of tropical houndshark, and part of the family Triakidae, found in the Bali and Indonesia areas of the Western Pacific.

References

 
 

white-fin smooth-hound
Fish of Indonesia
white-fin smooth-hound